Music for Relief is a 501(c)(3) charitable trust founded by the rock band Linkin Park in response to the 2004 Indian Ocean tsunami. Throughout its first twelve years, the organization responded to over 30 natural disasters across four continents, providing immediate help and funding long-term recovery with a focus on sustainability. In March 2018, Music for Relief announced its collaboration with the Entertainment Industry Foundation to amplify the results of its disaster relief and recovery work.

Building on EIF's historic commitment to furthering the philanthropic efforts of the entertainment community, Music for Relief allows for immediate response in the wake of a humanitarian crisis or natural disaster. By mobilizing the entertainment community and committing to work with key partners and organizations on the ground, MFR is able to deliver funding and support for vital services in real-time ensuring long-term sufficiency and resiliency in affected areas throughout the world.

About 
Music for Relief has raised over $8 million and provided support for the following humanitarian emergencies:
Indian Ocean tsunami
Hurricanes Katrina and Rita
Cyclone Sidr in Bangladesh
Haiti earthquake
Japan Tsunami Relief
East Africa Hunger Crisis
Hurricane Sandy
Typhoon Haiyan
Power the World
Ebola outbreak in West Africa
Flooding in the Balkans
Oklahoma Tornado
Reforestation in Brazil, US, Canada, Haiti, Palestine and Israel
MFR Green Home
Hurricane Maria
Hurricane Florence 
Hurricane Michael
Woolsey Fire in California
Camp Fire (2018) in California

Activities

Download to Donate in Haiti

In 2010 a devastating 7.0 magnitude earthquake struck Haiti, a country that was already suffering from extreme poverty and environmental degradation.
Responding just days after the quake, Music for Relief launched an innovative fundraising program called Download to Donate for Haiti. MFR compiled previously unreleased songs by A-list artists for digital release on musicforrelief.org. Supporters were asked to donate whatever they could. Funds raised provided immediate aid as well as long-term sustainable rebuilding solutions for the people affected by the earthquake.
More than 75,000 people downloaded the songs
Average donation was $16.47 (no donation was required)
The Download to Donate widget generated 9.7M views and 1.75M plays

Reforestation in Israel

Following the worst forest fires in Israel's history which burned areas of the Carmel Mountain Range near the city of Haifa in December 2010, Music for Relief contributed to partner Jewish National Fund for reforestation. Since the fires, rangers have focused on removing charred vegetation, creating firebreaks, monitoring unaffected trees in burnt areas, and repairing forest access roads. With Music for Relief's support, Jewish National Fund began re-planting in select areas where regeneration failed to occur. Music for Relief's contribution funds the planting of 1,100 trees as a part of Operation Carmel Renewal: From Black to Green.

Reforestation in Haiti

Music for Relief funds Konpay's reforestation project in and around the village of Cyvadier, in the southeast Department of Jacmel, Haiti. The goals of the project are to increase awareness of the importance of protecting trees and create advocates for the environment, to strengthen local water sources and regional water sheds, and to increase household income by offering fruit trees to participants. This effort strengthens Haitian solutions to environmental, social and economic problems by building collaborative networks, sharing technology and expertise, and mobilizing resources to support innovative Haitian-led initiatives.

Reforestation in US and Canada

Linkin Park has contributed $1 per ticket from their touring in North America since 2007 to support tree planting in the U.S. with American Forests and in Canada with Tree Canada. Trees planted in the U.S. were primarily to reforest areas burned following wildfires.

Reforestation in Brazil

Music for Relief contributed $57,000 in 2011 for the planting of 57,000 trees with The Nature Conservancy in Brazil's Atlantic Forest for their Plant A Billion Trees campaign. Only 12% of the Atlantic Forest's original area remains and only 7% is well conserved. It is one of the world's most endangered tropical forests, threatened by coastal development, urban expansion, and illegal logging. The forest provides clean water and hydro energy for over 130 million Brazilians and is home to an extraordinary array of biodiversity found nowhere else on earth. Much of what remains of the forest is found in isolated fragments, which are often too small to support a full array of its extraordinary biodiversity.

Hurricane Sandy

In October 2012 Hurricane Sandy left more than 8 million without power, created extensive flooding, and destruction in the Northeast of the United States and in Haiti. To date the super storm has impacted more than 60 million people, with extensive damage to homes and businesses. It is one of the largest storms to ever hit the U.S.
Music for Relief partnered with Save the Children in New York and New Jersey and with International Medical Corps in Haiti to provide immediate relief and long term assistance to the families affected by this immense storm.
To date Save the Children have helped replace indoor and outdoor learning materials that were damaged or destroyed by the storm, as well as provide other assistance, like transportation support to ensure that children are able to access child care and families are able to get back to work.
Following Hurricane Sandy, International Medical Corps added Mobile Medical Units at their already established site in Les Cayes Haiti, one of the hardest hit areas. In just two months they provided nearly 2,500 medical consultations for those struggling after the storm. IMC is also working to rehabilitate the Aquin water system to ensure a safe supply and distribute shelter, hygiene, and essential supplies to populations affected by Sandy in the South Department. Just under $100,000 was raised and contributed to help the recovery following Hurricane Sandy to date.

Oklahoma Tornado

In late May 2013 a series of tornadoes ripped through the US Midwest and Great Plains region.  Two devastating tornadoes hit the southern Oklahoma City Area.  An EF4 tornado struck a rural area in the town of Shawnee, OK on May 19, followed by a massive EF5 tornado that ripped through the area of Moore, OK on May 20.  Twenty-six people were killed, including 10 children.
With winds close to 200 mph, the tornado leveled almost everything in its path, impacting an estimated 10,000 people and damaging approximately 2,400 homes. MFR partnered with All Hands Volunteers to support their work in the community of El Reno to help clean fields and farmland of debris, gut homes and put their lives back together.  The $25,000 raise for Oklahoma Tornado Relief were used to cover cost of transporting volunteers (vehicles/fuel; getting them into the field/onto project sites) and equipping them with the tools needed to clear fields, remove debris and deconstruct houses and other structures.

Disaster Risk Mitigation

As a disaster-prone country frequently hit by volcanic eruptions, earthquakes, landslides and floods, Indonesia has a history of vulnerability to natural disasters, exemplified by the tragic 2004 tsunami that killed hundreds of thousands of people and caused tremendous damage to infrastructure. The Indonesian government has appealed to train people in vulnerable areas in an effort to help disaster preparedness. Music for Relief partnered with Terre des Hommes Netherlands with its Community Based Disaster Reduction Management. The disaster training aims to train individuals in the communities who can share their knowledge with others including school administrators, teachers and children, people living on the riverbanks, and people living in the slums of Jakarta.

East Africa Hunger Crisis

Beginning in 2011, Music for Relief joined K'naan and the American Refugee Committee as a part of the I AM A STAR campaign to raise awareness in the U.S. about the hunger crisis in the Horn of Africa.  The goal is to inspire people to get involved at the local level to help provide famine relief and shine a light on Somali culture and people.  MFR pledged $50,000 to support Banadir Hospital as well as another $50,000 to "Kitchen Mamas," a pilot program designed to help distribute information about health, WASH and disease protection, while improving access to service providers for gender-based violence and health providers who can treat cholera, HIV/AIDS and malnutrition.

Japan Tsunami Relief

To raise funds for children affected by the 2011 earthquake and tsunami in Japan, Music for Relief launched a Download to Donate playlist, with unreleased songs from leading artists. All funds benefit Save the Children's relief efforts in Japan.

Typhoon Haiyan

In November 2013, Typhoon Haiyan (Yolanda), possibly the strongest storm to make landfall in recorded history, struck and devastated portions of Southeast Asia, especially the Philippines. The extreme wind speeds from the typhoon left entire communities destroyed and the massive storm surge behaved much like a tsunami, wiping out infrastructure and causing significant flooding.
Music for Relief, in partnership with International Medical Corps, took immediate action to raise awareness and funds for disaster relief efforts. Funds raised assisted the 15 million people impacted by the storm. IMC was on the ground in the Philippines less than 48 hours after the storm providing lifesaving medical care, medication, clean water and other urgently needed supplies to affected families.
More than six months after the storm, MFR and IMC are still providing lifesaving programs including nutrition, water and sanitation, psychosocial support, and replacement and repair of health infrastructure.

Concert for the Philippines

After Typhoon Haiyan struck in November 2013, Music for Relief responded immediately to raise funds for those in need. They created a Typhoon Haiyan Bracelet for supporters who donated $25 or more to the cause. Artist partner, Steve Aoki pledged to match donations up to $36,000 in honor of his 36th birthday.

In January 2014, Music for Relief held Concert for the Philippines including performances from Linkin Park, The Offspring, Bad Religion, Heart, The Filharmonic and special guests including Travis Barker and Mike Einziger. Supporters of Music For Relief either raised or donated a minimum of $250 to attend this intimate concert at Club Nokia in Los Angeles.

Flooding in the Balkans

In May 2014 the Balkans were hit with severe floods affecting over 1 million people. In Bosnia alone, approximately 500 homes have been destroyed and 75,000 people have been displaced.
In partnership with International Medical Corps, Music for Relief took immediate action to raise funds for food as well as clean water and sanitation support, with an emphasis on disease prevention. Make a donation here and use #SupportTheBalkans to raise awareness.

Power the World

1.3 billion people in the world lack access to electricity. This staggering fact ignited Linkin Park's interest in helping to find solutions. In support of UN Secretary-General Ban Ki Moon's Sustainable Energy for All Initiative, Linkin Park has pledged to Power the World by helping raise awareness about energy access, highlighting solutions and providing clean energy tools.

Solar Lights in Haiti
Power the World's is bringing solar lights to families in Haiti, where 8 million people live without access to sustainable energy and frequently use candles or kerosene to light their homes. A $10 donation provides one solar powered lightbulb and will improve the quality of life for a family by lighting their home and enabling children to study, families to read, and all to feel safe and healthy.

Solar Suitcases in Uganda
We are improving health outcomes for mothers and babies by sending Solar Suitcases to clinics and hospitals in Uganda where maternal mortality rates are at a crisis point. These Solar Suitcases provide power for medical lighting and mobile communication and medical devices to help save lives of mothers and babies.

SOCCKET in South America
Power the World provides children with SOCCKETs, soccer balls that also function as portable generators. Each SOCCKET has the capability to power LED lamps, fans, cell phone chargers, water purifiers and audio speakers for an entire family.

Clean Cookstoves in Nepal
Electricity is a privilege unavailable to most poor families in Nepal. Because of this they must rely on thousands of pounds of wood a year for their daily cooking needs. We are bringing clean, biogas cookstoves to families to improve their health, safety and protect the environment.

Ebola Prevention

Since May 2014, West Africa is experiencing one of the largest Ebola outbreaks in history. In response to this crisis, Music for Relief is partnering with International Medical Corps to immediately raise funds for personal protective gear, which will enable health care workers to effectively treat more patients and help stop the spread of Ebola.

Accomplishments
Milestones
Reduced and offset harmful emissions produced by touring artists (busses, trucks, flights, hotels) by 882 tons
Music for Relief participated in China World Bank's 2nd China Development Marketplace to help evaluate and select post-earthquake recovery projects for funding 
Established Download to Donate for Haiti in response to the devastating earthquake to raise funds and awareness
Implemented disaster relief programs in response to earthquakes in Haiti and Chile as well as flooding in Pakistan
Reached goal of planting 1 million trees
Developed and launched the Power the World Initiative to raise awareness about the 1.3 billion people worldwide without access to electricity and to provide clean, renewable energy tools
 Music for Relief founders, Linkin Park, participated in the United Nations Foundation event Rio+Social. The UN Foundation launched Rio+Social around the Rio+20 climate meetings in order to initiate global conversation about how social media and technology can advance sustainable development
Music for Relief and Linkin Park conducted meetings with stakeholders in the U.S. and abroad to discuss sustainable energy and how clean energy can improve lives in specific regions. In the U.S. the team met with representatives from the U.S. State Department, Department of Energy as well as representatives from the private sector 
Launched Linkin Park signature series T‐shirt with Hard Rock International including Power the World messaging and branding in Hard Rock Locations

References

External links
 Official site
 Download To Donate

2004 Indian Ocean earthquake and tsunami
Development charities based in the United States
Music organizations based in the United States